Herman Bernhard Lundborg (April 7, 1868 in Väse in Värmland, Sweden – May 9, 1943 in Östhammar in Uppland, Sweden) was a Swedish physician and a race biologist.

Biography
He graduated in medicine at the Karolinska Institutet in 1895, and received his doctorate at the Uppsala University in 1903. He also habilitated there that year for psychiatry and neurology, and in 1915 for racial research and racial biology.

For his doctoral dissertation, Lundborg researched one of the genetic progressive myoclonus epilepsies first described by Heinrich Unverricht in 1891. Besides giving an account of the disease, he traced an affected family back to the 18th century, an analysis unique for that time. He concluded that the family had genetically degenerated because of "unwise marriages". The study has been described as "of considerable historic interest in human genetics". Over the years, the form of epilepsy became known as the Unverricht–Lundborg disease.

He was on the editorial board of the Hereditas journal, founded 1920, with the scope on genetics.

Lundborg was strongly involved with the ideology of racial hygiene. In the beginning of the 20th century, the idea that eugenics could improve the biological basis of society was widely held by academics and lawmakers, particularly in northern Europe and the United States. In 1922 Sweden established a eugenic governmental agency, the State Institute of Racial Biology, of which Lundborg was appointed as the head. Under his leadership, the institute began gathering copious statistics and photographs to map the racial make-up of about 100,000 Swedish people.

The Swedish writer Maja Hagerman has written a biography on Herman Lundborg and made a documentary about his racial research in Laponia.

In the media
In the novel 'The Hundred-Year-Old Man Who Climbed Out of the Window and Disappeared' by the Swedish author Jonas Jonasson, dr. Lundborg is portraited in chapter 4.

References

1868 births
1943 deaths
People from Karlstad Municipality
Swedish eugenicists
Swedish neurologists
Burials at Uppsala old cemetery